Michelle Edwards  (also known as Michelle Campbell, born 24 February 1969) is a British former hurdler who competed in the 100 metres hurdles at the 1991 World Championships in Tokyo. She placed second in the 100m hurdles in the 1995 AAA Championships. Her official lifetime best for the 100m hurdles is 13.26 seconds in August 1990. She also ran a wind-assisted 13.08 seconds at Azusa (California) in May 1995.

Career
Edwards competed for Haringey AC. She finished third behind Kay Morley and Lesley-Ann Skeete at both the 1989 AAA Indoor Championships 60m hurdles in 8.47 secs, and at the 1989 UK Championships in the 100m hurdles in 13.48 secs. She achieved her lifetime best of 13.26 on 3 August 1990 in Birmingham, when finishing fourth behind Skeete, Morley and Jacqui Agyepong at the AAA Championships. In 1991, she was third at the UK Championships behind Skeete and Louise Fraser, running 13.98 into a near four metre head-wind. Two months later she was fifth at the AAA Championships behind Sally Gunnell, Skeete, Morley-Brown and the American Jackie Humphrey, and earned selection for the 1991 World Championships in Tokyo, where she was eliminated in the heats in 13.50.

Edwards married American hurdler Tonie Campbell, and competing as Michelle Campbell, she ran a wind-assisted 13.08 (+4.0) on 26 May 1995 in California. She went on to run 13.36 to finish second at the 1995 AAA Championships, narrowly losing out to Melanie Wilkins, who won in 13.34.

Competition record

References

1969 births
Living people
British female hurdlers
English female hurdlers
World Athletics Championships athletes for Great Britain